Michael Wood (born 9 March 1962) is an English former professional footballer who played as a striker.

Career
Born in Halifax, Wood played for Guiseley, Rochdale and Colne Dynamoes.

Later life
Wood later lived in Baildon and worked as a printer.

References

1962 births
Living people
Footballers from Halifax, West Yorkshire
English footballers
Guiseley A.F.C. players
Rochdale A.F.C. players
Colne Dynamoes F.C. players
English Football League players
Association football forwards